Johann von Kelle (March 15, 1828 in Regensburg – January 30, 1909 in Prague) was a German philologist who studied the German language.

Biography
He attended the University of Munich where he studied classical philology. Inspired by Johann Andreas Schmeller, he turned his attention to the German language, and received a Ph.D. from the University of Würzburg in 1854. From 1855 to 1857, he was an editor for a Berlin publisher, where he oversaw the development of an encyclopedia.  During this time, he got to know the Grimm brothers. In 1857 he was made a full professor of German language and literature at the University of Prague, where he remained until his retirement in 1899. In 1891/92 he served as university rector.

Works
His work on Otfrid von Weissenburg includes:
 Otfrids von Weissenburg Evangelienbuch, Regensburg 1856.
 Die Formen- und Lautlehre der Sprache Otfrids, Regensburg 1869.
 Christi Leben und Lehre, besungen von Otfrid : Aus dem Althochdeutschen übersetzt, Prag 1870.
 Glossar zu Otfrids Evangelienbuch (1879–81).

His work on Notker Labeo is no less important: in general it aims to prove that the writings bearing his name are not by a school or group of translators, but by Notker alone. Writings include:
 Das Verbum und Nomen in Notker's Boëthius, Wien 1885.
 Die Sankt Galler deutschen Schriften und Notker Labeo (1888).
 Untersuchungen zur Überlieferung, Übersetzung, Grammatik der Psalmen Notkers, Berlin 1889.

Other works:
 Die Jesuiten-Gymnasien in Österreich (1873).
 Vergleichende Grammatik der germanischen Sprachen, vol. 1, Prag 1863.
 Geschichte der deutschen Litteratur von der ältesten Zeit bis zur Mitte des 11. Jahrhunderts (1892).
 Die Quelle von Ezzos Gesang von den Wundern Christi, in: Sitzungsberichte der philosophisch-historischen Classe der Kaiserlichen Akademie der Wissenschaften, vol. 129, Wien 1893.
 Speculum Ecclesiae (1858).

References
 
 

1828 births
1909 deaths
German philologists
Ludwig Maximilian University of Munich alumni
University of Würzburg alumni
Academic staff of Charles University
People from Regensburg